= Paul Whitehead Teaches Chess =

1985 video game

- Developer: Enlightenment
- Publisher: Enlightenment
- Platforms: Apple II, Commodore 64, IBM PC
- Release: 1985
- Genre: Chess

Paul Whitehead Teaches Chess is a video game published by Enlightenment, Inc in 1985.

== Gameplay ==
Paul Whitehead Teaches Chess is a game in which chess master Paul Whitehead teaches chess to a beginner up to a middle level chess player.

== Reception ==
Roy Wagner reviewed the game for Computer Gaming World, and stated that "There were some minor elements of the programming that I found objectionable, but overall the program is an excellent way to learn about the game of chess. The tone of the tutorial is very understandable. This program is highly recommended."
